Johnson Reef may refer to a number of maritime features in the Union Bank / Union Reefs of the Spratly Islands:
Johnson North Reef, also known as North Johnson Reef, Collins Reef and other names
Johnson South Reef, aka South Johnson Reef, Chìguā Jiāo, Đá Gạc Ma, Chigua Reef, Gạc Ma Reef and Mabini reef

See also
Johnson South Reef Skirmish

Reefs of the Spratly Islands